Archie is a masculine given name, a diminutive of Archibald. It may refer to:

People

Given name or nickname
Archie Alexander (1888–1958), African-American mathematician, engineer and governor of the US Virgin Islands
 Archie Blake (mathematician) (born 1906), American mathematician
 Archie Bleyer (1909–1989), American bandleader, music arranger, and record executive
 Archie Bradley (baseball) (born 1992), American baseball player
 Archie Bradley (boxer) (1897–1969), Australian boxer and rugby league player
 Archie Brown (historian) (born 1938), British political scientist and historian
 Archie Butterley, Australian fugitive who was shot dead in 1993
 Archie Campbell (disambiguation), several people
 Archie Carr (1909–1987), American herpetologist and a pioneer in sea turtle conservation
 Archie Christie (1889–1962), British businessman and military officer, first husband of mystery writer Agatha Christie
 Archie Clement (1846–1866), pro-Confederate guerrilla leader during the American Civil War and later bank robber
 Archie Clement (footballer) (1901–1984), English footballer
 Archie Cochrane (1909–1988), Scottish doctor
 Archibald Cox Jr. (1912–2004), American lawyer, law professor, US Solicitor General and a special prosecutor during the Watergate scandal
Archie Donahue (1917–2007), American Marine officer, flying ace and Navy Cross recipient
 Archie Gemmill (born 1947), Scottish former footballer
 Archie Green (1917–2009), American folklorist and labor rights activist
 Archie Griffin (born 1954), American former footballer running back
 Archie Jewell (1888–1917), English sailor who survived the sinking of the Titanic
 Archie Kao (born 1969), Chinese-American actor
 Archie Karas (born 1950), Greek gambler Anargyros Karabourniotis, known for turning $50 into $40 million before losing it all
 Archibald "Archie" Leach, birth name of English-born American actor Cary Grant (1904–1986)
 Archie League (1907–1986), generally considered the first air traffic controller
 Archie McCafferty
 Archie Macpherson (born 1937), Scottish sports broadcaster
 Archie Madekwe (born 1995), British actor
 Archie Manners (born 1993), British magician, comedian, and television presenter
 Archie Manning (born 1949), American former National Football League quarterback, father of Peyton and Eli Manning
 Archie Mayo (1891–1968), American film director, screenwriter, and actor
 Archie McLean (footballer) (1894–1971), Scottish footballer known for his contributions to the Brazilian game
 Archie Miller (disambiguation), several people
 Archie Moore (1916–1998), American world champion boxer, born Archibald Lee Wright
 Archie Norman (born 1954), British businessman and politician
 Archie Panjabi (born 1972), English actress
 Archie Renaux (born 1997), English actor and model
 Archie Roach (1956–2022), Australian singer
 Archie Shepp (born 1937), American jazz saxophonist
 Archie Sin (born 1998), Hong Kong singer and actor
 Archie Smith (disambiguation), several people
 Prince Archie of Sussex (born 2019), British royal
 Archie Thompson (born 1978), Australian footballer

Ring name
 Mixed Martial Archie, the professional wrestling persona of Robert Evans (wrestler) (born 1983)

Fictional characters
 Archie Andrews, the main character in Archie Comics
 Archie Andrews (puppet), ventriloquist Peter Brough's dummy
 Archie Bunker, in the television sitcoms All in the Family and Archie Bunker's Place
 Archie Kennedy, in the Hornblower television series
 Archibald Holden Buster "Archie" Williams, protagonist in Archie's Final Project
 Archie Carpenter, in the British soap opera Hollyoaks
 Archie Cullen, the male counterpart of Alice Cullen in the Twilight novel Life and Death: Twilight Reimagined
 Archie Goodwin (character), assistant of the fictional detective Nero Wolfe
 Archie Johnson, in the CBS crime drama CSI: Crime Scene Investigation
 Archie Mitchell, in the BBC soap opera EastEnders
 Archibald Archie Morris, in the medical drama series ER
 Archie Ryan, an alias of Lincoln Burrows, from the television show Prison Break
 Archie "Snake" Simpson, in the Degrassi franchise
 Archie (Pokémon), leader of Team Aqua in the Pokémon series
 Archie, a title character of archy and mehitabel, a serialized work of fiction by Don Marquis
 Archie, a turtle-like creature in The Land Before Time IV: Journey Through the Mists
 Archie (short for Archimedes), a flying ship in the Watchmen series
 Archie, in the CBeebies TV show Balamory
 Archie, a cute, anthropomorphised, talking chameleon in the CBeebies TV show Everything's Rosie
 Robot Archie, in Lion comics

References 

English masculine given names
Scottish masculine given names
Hypocorisms